Tautvydas Eliošius (born 3 November 1991) is a Lithuanian professional footballer who plays as an attacking midfielder for the A Lyga side FK Panevėžys.

Eliošius made his international debut in November 2014 when he came as substitute in Euro 2016 qualification match against Switzerland.

Career
Tautvydas started his career at FK Šiauliai where he trained together with his older brother Tadas Eliošius. In 2009 he finally broke into the first team and quickly became one of team leaders. Before 2014 season he joined other A Lyga side Kruoja. Midfielder led his team to silver medals, was elected into A Lyga Team of the Year, and awarded with A Lyga Goal of the Year.

After Kruoja collapsed in 2015, Eliošius joined Lithuanian champions Žalgiris, but he didn't become a first team player and was loaned out to Lietava on 15 July 2016. After the season Žalgiris terminated his contract by mutual agreement and Eliošius returned to Jonava as a free agent.

International career
Tautvydas Eliošius' first call-up to the senior Lithuania squad came in 2014 for the UEFA Euro 2016 qualifying against Switzerland.

References

External links

1991 births
Living people
People from Ukmergė
Lithuanian footballers
Lithuania international footballers
Association football midfielders
A Lyga players
FC Šiauliai players
FK Žalgiris players
FK Jonava players